Crawlspace is a 1972 made-for-television horror film and thriller directed by John Newland and Buzz Kulik, produced by Herbert Brodkin and Robert Berger, and written by Ernest Kinoy. The movie starred Arthur Kennedy, Teresa Wright, and Tom Happer. The movie aired on February 11, 1972 on CBS.

Origins

The film is based on the novel Crawlspace, written by Herbert Lieberman. The plot of the novel revolves around the relationship between an elderly couple, Albert and Alice Graves, and a young heating oil delivery man named Richard. When Richard comes by to refill their furnace, Alice invites the young man to stay for dinner. This innocent invitation proves to be a fateful decision for the Graves. The novel was published on January 1, 1971.

Plot

Elderly couple Albert Graves, (Arthur Kennedy) and his wife Alice (Teresa Wright) have just moved from the city to a small country town to help Albert recuperate from a heart attack.
 
After they discover a problem with the furnace in their basement, they call for a repairman to come out and service it. The repair company sends a boy named Richard Atlee (Tom Happer) to the house. The couple takes an interest in Richard, so they invite him to stay for dinner.

A few days later, Albert awakens to hear noise coming from under the house. To Albert's shock and bewilderment, he finds that the boy, Richard, has taken residence in the crawlspace of the house. Albert and Alice have longed for a child of their own for years, so they decide to take Richard in and more or less raise him. But Richard refuses to sleep in the main part of the house, and insists on staying in the crawlspace. Even after being warned about Richard's instability by the sheriff, Sheriff Birge (Eugene Roche), the couple continue to develop a close bond with the boy.
 
Sheriff Birge's suspicions are confirmed when Richard begins acting out violently toward the Graves and the town. Richard even resorts to crime. During one of his violent outbursts, he smashes up a section of the town's general store.

The film resolves in violence and tragedy.

Cast

 Tom Happer as Richard Roy Atlee
 Arthur Kennedy as Albert Graves
 Teresa Wright as Alice Graves
 Eugene Roche as Sheriff Emil Birge
 Matthew Cowles as Dave Freeman
 Dan Morgan as Dr. Harlow
 Roger Serbagi as Davalos
 Louise Campbell as Miz Gerard
 Fleet Emerson as Wheeler

DVD release

Crawlspace was released on DVD on October 1, 2007 by Wild Eye Releasing.

References

External links

1972 television films
1972 films
American horror thriller films
American horror television films
1970s American films